Miss Polski 2010 was the 21st Miss Polski pageant, held on August 29, 2010. The winner was Agata Szewioła of Lubusz. In addition to receiving the title Szewioła also received a Renault Clio. Szewioła represented Poland in Miss World 2010.

Final results

Special Awards

Judges
 Gerhard Parzutka von Lipiński - President of the Miss Polski competition
 Lech Daniłowicz - President and Owner of Missland
 Anna Jamróz - Miss Polski 2009
 Mariusz Kałamaga - Cabaret Artist
 Izabella Miko - Actress, Model
 Kamila Rutkowska - Director of the Spa Hotels St. George
 Piotr Walczak - President of the Lactalis company
 Karina Pinilla Corro - Miss Supranational 2010
 Roman Barot - President of the Board of Buy Together, Owner of Okazik.pl
 Janusz Tylman - Composer, Pianist

Finalists

Notes

Withdrawals
 Upper Poland

Did not compete
 Lower Poland
 Opole
 Subcarpathia
 Polish Community in Argentina
 Polish Community in Belarus
 Polish Community in Brazil
 Polish Community in Canada
 Polish Community in France
 Polish Community in Germany
 Polish Community in Ireland
 Polish Community in Israel
 Polish Community in Lithuania
 Polish Community in Russia
 Polish Community in South Africa
 Polish Community in Sweden
 Polish Community in the U.K.
 Polish Community in the U.S.
 Polish Community in Venezuela

References

External links
Official Website

2010
2010 beauty pageants
2010 in Poland